The Supreme Court of Justice of the Nation ( (SCJN) is the Mexican institution serving as the country's federal high court and the spearhead organisation for the judiciary of the Mexican Federal Government. It consists of eleven magistrates, known as ministers of the court, one of whom is designated the court's president.

Judges of the SCJN are appointed for 15 years. They are ratified through affirmation by the Senate from a list proposed by the President of the Republic. The ministers chosen will select from among themselves who shall be the President of the Court to serve a four-year period; any given minister may serve out more than one term as president, but may not do so consecutively.

Requirements for holding a seat on the Supreme Court of Justice of the Nation
 Be a natural born citizen of Mexico.
 Be no less than 35 years of age nor over 65 years of age at the time of one's appointment
 Have held a law degree for at least 10 years.
 To have a good reputation and have not have been convicted of theft, fraud, forgery, breach of trust, or any other offense which could imply a punishment of more than one year in prison.
 Not have been Director for Domestic Affairs, Chief of an Administrative Department, Attorney General of the Republic or Federal District Attorney, Senator, Member of Parliament, Governor of any State, or Chief Executive of the Federal District during the year prior to his or her appointment.

The Constitution requires that the appointment of ministers of the court should fall to those persons who have served ably, effectively and honorably in the administration of justice, or to those who have distinguished themselves by their honor, competence and professional background in the exercise of their duties.

Ministers may take leave of their posts for three reasons:
 The end of their terms
 Relinquishment, which is only allowed in serious cases, all of which must be affirmed by the President and accepted or discarded by the Senate.
 Voluntary retirement: Proceeds when the interested party requests their retirement, as long as they meet the conditions of age and seniority.

Supreme Court building

The court itself is located just off the main plaza of Mexico City on the corners of Pino Suarez and Carranza Streets. It was built between 1935 and 1941 by Mexican architect Antonio Muñoz Garcia. Prior to the Conquest, this site was reserved for the ritual known as Dance of the Flyers which is still practiced today in Papantla. Hernán Cortés claimed the property after the Conquest and its ownership was in dispute during much of the colonial period with Cortes' heirs, the city government, and the Royal and Pontifical University all claiming rights. It was also the site of a very large market known as El Volador.

Within the building, there are four flanks painted in 1941 by José Clemente Orozco, two of which are named The Social Labor Movement and Commonwealth. There is also a mural done by American artist George Biddle entitled "War and Peace" at the entrance to the law library. The building also contains a mural by Rafael Cauduro, which "graphically illustrates the Gran Guignol of Mexican torture", and includes a depiction of the 1968 Tlatelolco massacre as well as "a cut-away of a prison, perhaps the infamous Lecumberri Black Palace where student leaders who escaped death were jailed."

While this building is still the chief seat for the Supreme Court, an alternative site at Avenida Revolución was opened in 2002.

Current make-up of the Supreme Court

Presidents

The following persons were once Presidents of the Supreme Court under the 1917 Constitution:
 1917–1919: Enrique M. del Río
 1919–1920: Ernesto Garza Pérez
 1920–1922: Enrique Moreno Pérez
 1922–1923: Gustavo A. Vicencio
 1923–1924: Francisco Modesto Ramírez
 1924–1925: Gustavo A. Vicencio
 1925–1927: Manuel Padilla
 1927–1928: Francisco Díaz Lombardo
 1928–1929: Jesús Guzmán Vaca
 1929–1933: Julio García
 1934: Francisco H. Ruiz
 1934–1940: Daniel V. Valencia
 1941–1951: Salvador Urbina
 1952: Roque Estrada Reynoso
 1953: Hilario Medina
 1954: José María Ortiz Tirado
 1955–1956: Vicente Santos Guajardo
 1957: Hilario Medina
 1958: Agapito Pozo Balbás
 1959–1964: Alfonso Guzmán Neyra
 1965–1968: Agapito Pozo Balbás
 1969–1973: Alfonso Guzmán Neyra
 1974–1975: Euquerio Guerrero López
 1976: Mario G. Rebolledo Fernández
 1977–1981: Agustín Téllez Cruces
 1982: Mario G. Rebolledo Fernández
 1982–1985: Jorge Iñárritu y Ramírez de Aguilar
 1986–1990: Carlos del Río Rodríguez
 1991–1994: Ulises Schmill Ordóñez
 1995–1999: José Vicente Aguinaco Alemán
 1999–2002: Genaro David Góngora Pimentel
 2002–2006: Mariano Azuela Güitrón
 2007–2010: Guillermo Iberio Ortiz Mayagoitia
 2011–2014: Juan N. Silva Meza
 2015–2018: Luis María Aguilar Morales
 2019–incumbent: Arturo Zaldívar Lelo de Larrea

References

External links

 Official site

Judiciary of Mexico
Mexico
Landmarks in Mexico City
Buildings and structures in Mexico City
Government agencies established in 1917
State archives
20th century in Mexico
Mexican art